The Asian giant hornet (Vespa mandarinia) or northern giant hornet, including the color form referred to as the Japanese giant hornet, is the world's largest hornet. It is native to temperate and tropical East Asia, South Asia, Mainland Southeast Asia, and parts of the Russian Far East. It was also found in the Pacific Northwest of North America in late 2019 with a few more additional sightings in 2020, and nests found in 2021, prompting concern that it could become an invasive species. There were no confirmed sightings in North America at all in 2022, however, by the end of the season in November, suggesting the wasps may have been eradicated in that region.

Asian giant hornets prefer to live in low mountains and forests, while almost completely avoiding plains and high-altitude climates. V. mandarinia creates nests by digging, co-opting pre-existing tunnels dug by rodents, or occupying spaces near rotten pine roots. It feeds primarily on larger insects, colonies of other eusocial insects, tree sap, and honey from honey bee colonies.

Taxonomy and phylogeny

V. mandarinia is a species in the genus Vespa, which comprises all true hornets. Along with seven other species, V. mandarinia is a part of the V. tropica species group, defined by the single notch located on the apical margin of the seventh gastral sternum of the male. The most closely related species within the species group is V. soror. The triangular shape of the apical margin of the clypeus of the female is diagnostic, the vertex of both species is enlarged, and the shape of the apex of the aedeagus is distinct and similar. Division of the genus into subgenera has been attempted in the past, but has been abandoned, due to the anatomical similarity among species and because behavioral similarity is not associated with phylogeny. The species has been around since the Miocene as indicated by fossils found in Shanwang formation.

As of 2012, three subspecies were recognized: V. m. mandarinia, V. m. magnifica, and V. m. nobilis. The former subspecies referred to as V. m. japonica has not been considered valid since 1997. The most recent revision in 2020 eliminated all of the subspecies rankings entirely, with "japonica", "magnifica", and "nobilis" now relegated to informal non-taxonomic names for different color forms.

Common names 
Since its discovery in North America, the scientific literature and official government sources refer to this species by its established common name, Asian giant hornet, whilst the mainstream media have taken to using the nickname "murder hornet". In July 2022, the Entomological Society of America stated that they will adopt the common name northern giant hornet for the species.

Description
Regardless of sex, the hornet's head is a light shade of orange and its antennae are brown with a yellow-orange base. Its eyes and ocelli are dark brown to black. V. mandarinia is distinguished from other hornets by its pronounced clypeus and large genae. Its orange mandible contains a black tooth that it uses for digging. Its fore legs are brighter than the mid and hind legs. The base of the fore legs is darker than the rest. The abdomen alternates between bands of dark brown or black, and a yellow-orange hue (consistent with its head color). The sixth segment is yellow.

Queens and workers
The queens are considerably larger than workers. The reproductive anatomy is consistent between the two, but workers do not reproduce.

Drones
Drones (males) are similar to females, and can attain  in length, but lack stingers. This is a consistent feature among the Hymenoptera.

Larvae
Larvae spin a silk cocoon when they complete development and are ready to pupate. Larval silk proteins have a wide variety of potential applications due to their wide variety of potential morphologies, including the native fiber form, but also sponge, film, and gel.

Genome 
The mitochondrial genome is provided by Chen et al., 2015. This data has also been important to confirm the place of the wider Vespidae family in the Vespoidea superfamily, and confirms that Vespoidea is monophyletic.

Misidentifications
Within two days of the initial 2020 news report on V. mandarinia, insect identification centers in the eastern United States (where the wasp does not occur) began getting identification requests, and have been swamped ever since, even though not one of the thousands of submitted photos or samples has been of V. mandarinia, but have instead primarily been wasps such as the European hornet (V. crabro), the eastern cicada killer (Sphecius speciosus), or the southern yellowjacket (Vespula squamosa). Submissions suspected by laymen to be V. mandarinia also include other wasps of various sizes, bees, sawflies, horntails, wasp-mimicking flies, beetles, Jerusalem crickets, cicadas, and even a plastic children’s toy that was wasp-like in appearance, all of which were routinely estimated to be 130-185% of their actual size.

Reports of this species from other parts of the world appear to be erroneous identifications of other introduced hornet species, such as V. orientalis in several locations around the world, and V. velutina in Europe.

Distribution

Ecological distribution
V. mandarinia is primarily a forest dweller. When it does live in urban landscapes, however, V. mandarinia is highly associated with green space. It is the most dependent upon green space of the Vespa species (with V. analis the least). Extremely urbanized areas thus provide a refuge for V. analis, whereas V. mandarinia – its predator – is entirely absent.

Geographic distribution

Asia
The Asian giant hornet can be found in:

 Russia – Primorsky Krai, Khabarovsky Krai (southern part only), and Jewish Autonomous Oblast region
 Korea (where it is called  "general giant bee, general hornet")
 Mainland China
 Taiwan
 Laos
 Thailand
 Cambodia
 Myanmar
 Vietnam
 Nepal
 India
 Sri Lanka
 Japan – It is common in Japan.

North America
The first confirmed sightings of the Asian giant hornet in North America were confirmed in 2019 and have mainly been concentrated in the Vancouver area, with nests also discovered in neighboring Whatcom County, Washington, in the United States.

 In August 2019, three hornets were found in Nanaimo on Vancouver Island, and a large nest was found and destroyed shortly thereafter;
 At the end of September, a worker was reported in Blaine, Washington.
 Another worker was found in Blaine in October;
 On 8 December 2019, another worker was found in Blaine;
 A male hornet was captured in Custer, Washington on 29 July 2020.
 A hornet of unknown caste was reported on 18 August 2020, in Birch Bay, and another was trapped in the same area the following day.
 Three hornets were seen (and two killed) southeast of Blaine on 21 and 25 September 2020, and three more were found in the same area on 29 and 30 September, prompting officials to report that attempts were underway to pinpoint and destroy a nest believed to be in the area.
The nest was eradicated the next day, including the immediate discovery and removal of about 100 hornets. At first the owner of the land required the nest to be returned, and he advertised it for sale. A local beekeeper bought it from him and gifted it back to the state entomology team. After further analysis, it was determined that the nest had contained about 500 live specimens, including about 200 queens. Some of these specimens were sent to the Smithsonian Institution to become a part of the NMNH Biorepository permanent cryogenic collection. It was announced that several undiscovered live nests were also believed to exist within Washington State, when considering the captures of individual hornets in Birch, Blaine, and Custer that were all relatively far from the discovered nest. However, cautious optimism was expressed by officials saying that it might still be possible to eradicate the hornets before they can become established in the area. A Canadian official said that although individual specimens had been found in Canada and some nests were suspected to exist there, the presence there seemed to be only in near-border regions, and the center of the invasion seemed to be in Washington State.
 On 2 November 2020, one individual was found in Abbotsford, BC. As a result the BC government asked Abbotsford beekeepers and residents to report any sightings.
 On 7 November 2020, a queen was found in Aldergrove, BC.
 On 11 August 2021, a nest was discovered in Whatcom County, Washington near Blaine, only  from the nest WSDA eradicated in 2020. This nest was destroyed two weeks later on 25 August, before it could produce new queens.
 In September 2021, two more nests were found near Blaine, in the vicinity of the nest found in August, and a "potential sighting" was reported from near Everson, some 25 miles east of Blaine.

A mitochondrial DNA analysis was performed to determine the maternal population(s) ancestral to the British Columbia and Washington introduced populations. The high dissimilarity between these two was similar to the mutual distances between each of the Chinese, Japanese, and Korean native populations suggesting the specimens collected in 2019 were from two different maternal populations, Japanese in BC and South Korean in Washington.

In April 2020, authorities in Washington asked members of the public to be alert and report any sightings of these hornets, which are expected to become active in April if they are in the area. If they become established,  the hornets "could decimate bee populations in the United States and establish such a deep presence that all hope for eradication could be lost." A "full-scale hunt" for the species by the WSDA was then underway. Two assessment models of their potential to spread from their present location on the US–Canada border suggested that they could spread northward into coastal British Columbia and Southeast Alaska, and southward as far as southern Oregon. The USDA's Agricultural Research Service is engaged in lure/attractant development and molecular genetics research, both as part of its normal research mission, but also to further the near-term eradication goal in Washington.

In 2020, the United States Congress considered specific legislation to eradicate V. mandarinia including a proposal by the Interior Secretary, the Fish and Wildlife Director, and the other relevant agencies, which has been introduced as an amendment to the appropriations omnibus. British Columbia Agriculture is prepared for a "long fight" lasting years, if necessary. One advantage humans will have is the lack of diversity of such an invasive population – leaving the hornets less prepared for novel environments and challenges.

On June 4, 2021 a dead, desiccated male was found near Marysville, Snohomish County, Washington and reported to WSDA. Its different, more reddish color form immediately suggested yet another parental population from the Japanese and Korean ones already known, but DNA testing was needed. USDA APHIS (Animal and Plant Health Inspection Service) did the analysis and a few days later together with WSDA confirmed it was of a third, unrelated population. The discovery of a male in June is "perplexing" given that the earliest male emergence in 2020 was July, which was already earlier than normal for the home range. This and its desiccated state indicate it did not emerge in 2021 at all, but is instead a dead specimen that had already emerged in a previous year.

The WSDA announced in December 2022 that there were "no confirmed sightings" of the hornet in the state for that year.

Nesting
V. mandarinia nests in low mountain foothills and lowland forests. As a particularly dominant species, no efforts are directed toward conserving V. mandarinia or its habitats, as they are common in areas of low human disturbance. Unlike other species of Vespa, V. mandarinia almost exclusively inhabits subterranean nests  in 1978 it was still doubted that aerial nests were possible, as Matsuura and Sakagami reported this to be unknown in Japan in 1973 and aerial nesting is still described as extremely rare in Japan, and yet  all nests in the invasive range have been aerial. In a study of 31 nests, 25 were found around rotten pine roots, and another study found only 9 of 56 nests above ground. Additionally, rodents, snakes, or other burrowing animals previously made some of the tunnels. The entrance at the ground surface varies in length from  either horizontally, inclined, or vertically. The queens that found the nest prefer narrow cavities.

Nests of V. mandarinia typically lack a developed envelope. During the initial stages of development, the envelope is in an inverted-bowl shape. As the nest develops, one to three rough sheets of combs are created. Often, single primordial combs are created simultaneously and then fused into a single comb.

A system of one main pillar and secondary pillars connects the combs. Nests usually have four to seven combs. The top comb is abandoned after summer and left to rot. The largest comb is at the middle to bottom portion of the nest.

Colony cycle
The nesting cycle of V. mandarinia is fairly consistent with that of other eusocial insects. Six phases occur in each cycle.

Pre-nesting period
Inseminated and uninseminated queens enter hibernation following a cycle. They first appear in early to mid-April and begin feeding on the sap of Quercus (oak) trees. Although this timing is consistent among hornets, V. mandarinia dominates the order, receiving preference for premium sap sources. Among the V. mandarinia queens is a dominance hierarchy. The top-ranked queen begins feeding, while the other queens form a circle around her. Once the top queen finishes, the second-highest-ranking queen feeds. This process repeats until the last queen feeds at a poor hour.

Solitary, cooperative, and polyethic periods
Inseminated queens start to search for nesting sites in late April. The uninseminated queens do not search for nests, since their ovaries never fully develop. They continue to feed, but then disappear in early July.

An inseminated queen begins to create relatively small cells in which she raises around 40 small workers. Workers do not begin to work outside of the hive until July. Queens participate in activities outside the hive until mid-July, when they stay inside the nest and allow workers to do extranidal activities. Early August marks a fully developed nest, containing three combs holding 500 cells and 100 workers. After mid-September, no more eggs are laid and the focus shifts to caring for larvae. The queens die in late October.

Dissolution and hibernating period

Males and new queens take on their responsibilities in mid-September and mid-October, respectively. During this time, their body color becomes intense and the weights of the queens increase about 20%. Once the males and queens leave the nest, they do not return. In V. mandarinia, males wait outside the nest entrance until the queens emerge, when males intercept them in midair, bring them to the ground, and copulate from 8 to 45 seconds. After this episode, the males return to the entrance for a second chance, while the now-mated queens leave to hibernate. Many queens (up to 65%) attempt to fight off the males and leave unfertilized, at least temporarily. After this episode, pre-hibernating queens are found in moist, subterranean habitats.

When sexed individuals emerge, workers shift their focus from protein and animal foods to carbohydrates. The last sexed individuals to emerge may die of starvation.

Sting

Venom
That stinger injects an especially potent venom that contains . Mastoparans are found in many bee and wasp venoms. They are cytolytic peptides that can damage tissue by stimulating phospholipase action, in addition to its own phospholipase. Masato Ono, an entomologist at Tamagawa University, described the sensation of being stung as feeling "like a hot nail being driven into my leg". Besides using their stingers to inject venom, Asian giant hornets are apparently able to spray venom into a person's eyes under certain circumstances, with one report in 2020 from Japan of long-term damage, though the exact extent of actual visual impairment still remains unassessed.

The venom contains a neurotoxin called , a single-chain polypeptide with a molecular weight around 20 kDa. While a single wasp cannot inject a lethal dose, multiple stings can be lethal even to people who are not allergic if the dose is sufficient, and allergy to the venom greatly increases the risk of death. (In comparison, the deadliest wasp venom (at least to laboratory mice) by weight belongs to V. luctuosa at 1.6mg/kg.) The potency of the V. mandarinia sting is due, rather, to the relatively large amount of venom injected.

Immunogenicity
Evidence is insufficient to believe that prophylactic immunotherapy for the venom of other Vespidae will prevent allergic reaction to V. mandarinia venom, because of wide differences in venom chemistry.

Effects on humans
In 1957, van der Vecht was under the impression humans in the native range lived in constant fear of V. mandarinia and Iwata reported in 1976 that research and removal were hampered by its attacks. However they are now widely agreed to present little danger to humans.

Parasites
The strepsipteran Xenos moutoni is a common parasite among Vespa species. In a study of parasites among species of Vespa, 4.3% of V. mandarinia females were parasitized. Males were not stylopized (parasitization by stylopid strepsipterans, such as X. moutoni) at all. The major consequence of being parasitized is the inability to reproduce, and stylopized queens follow the same fate as uninseminated queens. They do not search for an area to create a new colony and feed on sap until early July, when they disappear. In other species of Vespa, males also have a chance of being stylopized. The consequences between the two sexes are similar, as neither sex is able to reproduce.

Communication and perception

V. mandarinia uses both visual and chemical cues as a means of navigating itself and others to the desired location. Scent marking was discussed as a way for hornets to direct other members of the colony to a food source. Even with antennae damage, V. mandarinia was able to navigate itself. It was unable to find its destination only when vision impairment was induced. This implies that while chemical signaling is important, visual cues play an equally important role in guiding individuals. Other behaviors include the formation of a "royal court" consisting of workers that lick and bite the queen, thereby ingesting her pheromones.

These pheromones could directly communicate between the queen and her court or indirectly between her court and other workers due to the ingested pheromones. This is merely speculation, as no direct evidence has been collected to suggest the latter. V. mandarinia communicates acoustically, as well. When larvae are hungry, they scrape their mandibles against the walls of the cell. Furthermore, adult hornets click their mandibles as a warning to other creatures that encroach upon their territories.

Scent marking
V. mandarinia is the only species of social wasp known to apply a scent to direct its colony to a food source. The hornet secretes the chemical from the sixth sternal gland, also known as  van der Vecht's gland. This behavior is observed during autumnal raids after the hornets begin hunting in groups instead of individually. The ability to apply scents may have arisen because the Asian giant hornet relies heavily on honey bee colonies as its main food source. A single hornet is unable to take on an entire colony of honey bees because species such as Apis cerana have a well-organized defense mechanism; the honey bees swarm one wasp and flutter their wings to heat up the hornet and raise carbon dioxide to a lethal level. So, organized attacks are much more effective and easily devastate a colony of tens of thousands of honey bees.

Interspecies dominance
In an experiment observing four different species of Vespa (V. ducalis, V. crabro, V. analis, and V. mandarinia), V. mandarinia was the dominant species. Multiple parameters were set to determine this. The first set parameter observed interaction-mediated departures, which are defined as scenarios wherein one species leaves its position due to the arrival of a more dominant individual. The proportion of interaction-mediated departures was the lowest for V. mandarinia. Another measured parameter was attempted patch entry. Over the observed time, conspecifics (interactions with the same species) resulted in refused entry far more than heterospecifics (interactions with different species). Lastly, when feeding at sap flows, fights between these hornets, Pseudotorynorrhina japonica, Neope goschkevitschii, and Lethe sicelis were observed, and once more V. mandarinia was the most dominant species. In 57 separate fights, one loss was observed to Neope goschkevitschii, giving V. mandarinia a win rate of 98.3%. Based on interaction-mediated departures, attempted patch entry, and interspecific fights, V. mandarinia is the most dominant Vespa species.

Diet

The Asian giant hornet is intensely predatory; it hunts medium- to large-sized  insects, such as bees, other hornet and wasp species, beetles, hornworms, and mantises. The latter are favored targets in late summer and fall. Large insects such as mantises are key protein sources to feed queen and drone larvae. Workers forage to feed their larvae, and since their prey can include crop pests, the hornets are sometimes regarded as beneficial.
This hornet often attacks colonies of other Vespa species (V. simillima being the usual prey species), Vespula species, and honey bee (such as Apis cerana and A. mellifera) hives to obtain the adults, pupae, and larvae as food for their own larvae; sometimes, they also cannibalize each other's colonies. A single scout, sometimes two or three, cautiously approaches the hive, producing pheromones to lead its nest-mates to the hive. The hornets can devastate a colony of honey bees, especially if it is the introduced western honey bee; a single hornet can kill as many as 40 bees per minute due to its large mandibles, which can quickly strike and decapitate prey. The honey bees' stings are ineffective because the hornets are five times their size and heavily armored. Only a few hornets (under 50) can exterminate a colony of tens of thousands of bees in a few hours. The smaller Asian hornet similarly preys on honey bees, and has been spreading throughout Europe.

Hornet larvae, but not adults, can digest solid protein; the adult hornets can only drink the juices of their victims, and they chew their prey into a paste to feed to their larvae. The workers dismember the bodies of their prey to return only the most nutrient-rich body parts, such as flight muscles, to the nest. Larvae of predatory social vespids generally (not just Vespa) secrete a clear liquid, sometimes referred to as Vespa amino acid mixture, the exact amino acid composition of which varies considerably from species to species, and which they produce to feed the adults on demand.

Native honey bees

Beekeepers in Japan attempted to introduce western honey bees (Apis mellifera) for the sake of their high productivity. Western honey bees have no innate defense against the hornets, which can rapidly destroy their colonies, Kakugo virus infection, though, may provide an extrinsic defence. Although a handful of Asian giant hornets can easily defeat the uncoordinated defenses of a western honey bee colony, the Japanese honey bee (Apis cerana japonica) has an effective strategy. When a hornet scout locates and approaches a Japanese honey bee hive, she emits specific pheromonal hunting signals. When the Japanese honey bees detect these pheromones, 100 or so gather near the entrance of the nest and set up a trap, keeping the entrance open. This permits the hornet to enter the hive. As the hornet enters, a mob of hundreds of bees surrounds it in a ball, completely covering it and preventing it from reacting effectively. The bees violently vibrate their flight muscles in much the same way as they do to heat the hive in cold conditions. In addition, the exertions of the honey bees raise the level of carbon dioxide (CO2) in the ball. Some honey bees do die along with the intruder, much as happens when they attack other intruders with their stings, but by killing the hornet scout, they prevent it from summoning reinforcements that would wipe out the entire colony.

Detailed research suggests this account of the behavior of the honey bees and a few species of hornets is incomplete and that the honey bees and the predators are developing strategies to avoid expensive and mutually unprofitable conflict. Instead, when honey bees detect scouting hornets, they transmit an "I see you" signal that commonly warns off the predator. Another defence used by Apis cerana is speeding up dramatically when returning to the colony, to avoid midair attacks.

Diet in North America
The WSDA found V. mandarinia to be preying on cluster fly, orange legged drone fly, bristle fly, bronze birch borer beetle, western honey bee, western yellowjacket, German yellowjacket, aerial yellowjacket, bald faced hornet, European paper wasp, golden paper wasp, paddle-tailed darner dragonfly, shadow darner dragonfly, large yellow underwing moth, blinded sphinx moth, and red admiral butterfly (Vanessa atalanta). They had also eaten cow's meat, but the WSDA assumes this to be beef from a hamburger.

Pollination
V. mandarinia is not solely carnivorous, but also a pollinator. It is among the diurnal pollinators of the obligate plant parasite Mitrastemon yamamotoi. It is among the most common pollinators of Musella lasiocarpa in the Yunnan Province of China.

Extermination methods
As of 1973, six different methods were used to control hornets in Japan; these methods decrease damage done by V. mandarinia.

Beating
Hornets are crushed with wooden sticks with flat heads. Hornets do not counterattack when they are in the bee-hunting phase or the hive-attack phase ("slaughter"), but they aggressively guard a beehive once they kill the defenders and occupy it. The biggest expenditure in this method is time, as the process is inefficient.

Nest removal
Applying poisons or fires at night is an effective way of exterminating a colony. The most difficult part about this tactic is finding the subterranean nests. The most common method of discovering nests is giving a piece of frog or fish meat attached to a cotton ball to a wasp and following it back to its nest.

For the rare nest that is up in a tree, wrapping the tree in plastic and vacuuming the hornets out is used.

Bait traps
Bait traps can be placed in apiaries. The system consists of multiple compartments that direct the hornet into a one-sided hole which is difficult to return through once it is in the cul-de-sac compartment, an area located at the top of the box from which honey bees can escape through a mesh opening, but wasps cannot due to their large size. Baits used to attract the hornets include a diluted millet jelly solution or a crude sugar solution with a mixture of intoxicants, vinegar, or fruit essence.

The WSDA has been using plastic bottle traps, baited with fruit juice and added alcohol. The alcohol is used because it repels bees, but not V. mandarinia, thus reducing the bycatch.

Mass poisoning
Hornets at the apiary are captured and fed a sugar solution or bee that has been poisoned with malathion. The toxin is expected to spread through trophallaxis. This method is good in principle, but has not been tested extensively.

Trapping at hive entrances
The trap is attached to the front of beehives. The effectiveness of the trap is determined by its ability to capture hornets while allowing honey bees to escape easily. The hornet enters the trap and catches a bee. When it tries to fly back through the entrance of the hive, it hits the front of the trap. The hornet flies upwards to escape and enters the capture chamber, where the hornets are left to die. Some hornets find a way to escape the trap through the front, so these traps can be very inefficient.

Protective screens
As explained in the trapping section, if met by resistance, hornets lose the urge to attack and instead retreat. Different measures of resistance include weeds, wire, or fishing nets or limiting the passage size so only honey bees can make it through. Experienced hornets catch on and eventually stay on these traps, awaiting the arrival of bees. The best method of controlling hornets is to combine protective screens with traps.

Human consumption
In some Japanese mountain villages, the nests are excavated and the larvae are considered a delicacy when fried. In the central Chūbu region, these wasps are sometimes eaten as snacks or an ingredient in drinks. The grubs are often preserved in jars, pan-fried or steamed with rice to make a savory dish called hebo-gohan. The adults are fried on skewers, stinger and all, until the body becomes crunchy.

Economic impact

If V. mandarinia reaches all suitable habitat in North America, control costs in the United States will be over US$113.7 million/year (possibly significantly higher).

Agricultural impact
If V. mandarinia reaches all suitable habitat in North America, bee products would bring in US$11.98 ± 0.64 million less per year, and bee-pollinated crops would produce US$101.8 million less per year. New York, Massachusetts, Pennsylvania, Connecticut, North Carolina, New Jersey, and Virginia would be  most severely affected. By region, New England would be worst hit, and to a lesser degree the entire northeast and the entirety of eastern North America. New England would become by far the greatest concentration of V. mandarinia in the world, far surpassing the original introduction site (the Pacific Northwest), and even its home range of East Asia. Alfalfa/other hays, apples, grapes, tobacco, cotton, and blueberries would be the crops most severely affected.

See also

 List of largest insects

References

</ref>

 .

Secondary support of Alaniz:

 Page 157.

  .

Further information

External links

 The Asian Giant Hornet
 Yellowjackets and hornets
 Video footage, National Geographic
 Asian giant hornet images
 Species Profile – Asian Giant Hornet (Vespa mandarinia), National Invasive Species Information Center, United States National Agricultural Library
 

Hymenoptera of Asia
Insects described in 1852
Taxa named by Frederick Smith (entomologist)
Vespidae